Ilan Baruch (born 1974) is an Israeli plein air landscape painter.

His "cactus" series, painted over a period of three years, began as "fastidiously rendered... sun-drenched, [and] naturalistic," progressing to images that are "expressive [and] closely cropped."

Invited to create a pair of new "Delft" tiles for the 2014 exhibition Blue-and-White Delftware, Baruch painted one with an olive tree and another with an image of the Dome of the Rock.

Solo exhibitions
1992, Nidbach (Layer), Jerusalem
2004, The Cactus: Introspections, Helena Rubinstein Pavilion for Contemporary Art, Tel Aviv Museum of Art
2005, MonartMuseum
2013, "It was never truly a wilderness", at the Ramat Gan Museum of Israeli Art

Group exhibitions
1999, Bezalel Academy of Arts and Design
2000, Yanko Dada Museum in EinHod, "Introspection Time"
2000, "Observation Time"
2007, Tel Aviv Museum of Art, New Acquisitions
2014, Blue-and-White Delftware, Tel Aviv Museum of Art

References

1974 births
Israeli landscape painters
Living people